Dipturus oxyrinchus, commonly known as the longnose skate, is a species of skate in the family Rajidae. It is up to  m in length. The species is found in eastern Atlantic Ocean and in the Mediterranean Sea.

References 

Fish described in 1758
Taxa named by Carl Linnaeus